The 1st arrondissement of Paris (Ier arrondissement) is one of the 20 arrondissements of the capital city of France. In spoken French, this arrondissement is colloquially referred to as le premier (the first). It is governed locally together with the 2nd, 3rd and 4th arrondissement, with which it forms the 1st sector of Paris (Paris-Centre).

Also known as Louvre, the arrondissement is situated principally on the right bank of the River Seine. It also includes the west end of the Île de la Cité. The locality is one of the oldest areas in Paris, the Île de la Cité having been the heart of the city of Lutetia, conquered by the Romans in 52 BC, while some parts on the right bank (including Les Halles) date back to the early Middle Ages.

It is the least populated of the city's arrondissements and one of the smallest by area, with a land area of only 1.83 km2 (0.705 sq. miles, or 451 acres). A significant part of the area is occupied by the Louvre Museum and the Tuileries Gardens. The Forum des Halles is the largest shopping mall in Paris. Much of the remainder of the arrondissement is dedicated to business and administration.

Demography
The area now occupied by the first arrondissement attained its peak population in the period preceding the re-organization of Paris in 1860. In 1999, the population was 16,888, while the arrondissement hosted 63,056 jobs, making it one of the most active for business after the 2nd, 8th, and 9th.

Historical population
1

Immigration

Quarters

Each of the 20 Paris arrondissements is divided into four-quarters (quartiers). The table below lists the four-quarters of the 1st arrondissement:

figures from 1999 French census

Economy
Korean Air's France office is in the 1st arrondissement.

At one time Air Inter's head office was located in the first arrondissement. When Minerve, an airline, existed, its head office was in the first arrondissement.

Education
In terms of state-operated schools, the first arrondissement has two nursery schools (écoles maternelles), two primary schools (écoles élémentaires), one école polyvalente, one high school (collège), and one sixth-form college (lycée).

The state-operated nursery schools are École Maternelle Auxerrois and École Maternelle Sourdiere. The state-operated primary schools are École Élémentaire Arbre Sec and École Élémentaire D'Argenteuil. The arrondissement has one école polyvalente, École Polyvalente Cambon. Collège Jean-Baptiste Poquelin is the sole state-operated high school in the arrondissement. Lycée Professionnel Commercial Pierre Lescot is the sole state-operated sixth-form college in the first arrondissement.

Private primary and secondary institutions in the arrondissement include École Élémentaire Privée Notre-Dame-Saint-Roch, École du 2nd Degré Professionnel Privée Pigier, and École Technologique Privée de Dessin Technique et Artistique Sornas.

Map

Cityscape

Places of interest

 Arc de Triomphe du Carrousel, at the eastern end of the Axe historique ("grand historic axis")
 Banque de France headquarters
 Colonne Médicis
 Comédie-Française
 Crédit Foncier de France historical headquarters
 The Louvre
 Galerie Véro-Dodat
 Les Halles
 Musée des Arts Décoratifs
 Musée de la Mode et du Textile
 Musée de la Publicité 
 Musée du Barreau de Paris
 Musée Grévin – Forum des Halles
 Musée des Lunettes et Lorgnettes Pierre Marly
 Palais Royal
 Hôtel de Vendôme
 Hôtel de Rambouillet (former building)
 Hôtel Ritz Paris
 La Sainte-Chapelle
 La Samaritaine
 Tuileries Garden
 Galerie nationale du Jeu de Paume
 Musée de l'Orangerie

Bridges
 Pont Neuf
 Pont des Arts

Streets and squares
 Avenue de l'Opéra (partial)
Rue Molière
 Rue de Rivoli (partial)
 Place Vendôme and the Vendôme Column

See also

 Street Names of Paris, 1er arrondissement

References

External links